Michal Demeter (born 15 May 1982) is a Slovak football player who last played for Olympia Prague.

References

External links

1982 births
Living people
Slovak footballers
ŠK Slovan Bratislava players
Czech First League players
FC Vysočina Jihlava players
FK Bohemians Prague (Střížkov) players
Association football defenders